Beasts of the Sea (French: Les bêtes de la mer) is a paper collage on canvas by Henri Matisse from 1950. It is currently in the collection of the National Gallery of Art, Washington, DC. During the early-to-mid-1940s Matisse was in poor health. Eventually by 1950 he stopped painting in favor of his paper cutouts. Beasts of the Sea, is an example of Matisse's final body of works known as the cutouts.

Notes and references

1950 paintings
Paintings by Henri Matisse
Collections of the National Gallery of Art